Jan Koutný (24 June 1897 – 18 July 1976) was a Czech gymnast who competed for Czechoslovakia in the 1924 Summer Olympics and in the 1928 Summer Olympics. He was born in Vyškov and died in Prague.

In 1924 he won a silver medal in the vault competition. At the 1924 Summer Olympics he also participated in the following events:

 Rings - seventh place
 Individual all-around - eleventh place
 Parallel bars - eleventh place
 Sidehorse vault - twelfth place
 Pommel horse - 22nd place
 Rope climbing - 24th place
 Horizontal bar - 35th place
 Team all-around - did not finish

Four years later he was a member of the Czechoslovak gymnastic team which won the silver medal.

References

External links

1897 births
1976 deaths
Czechoslovak male artistic gymnasts
Olympic gymnasts of Czechoslovakia
Gymnasts at the 1924 Summer Olympics
Gymnasts at the 1928 Summer Olympics
Olympic silver medalists for Czechoslovakia
Olympic medalists in gymnastics
Medalists at the 1928 Summer Olympics
Medalists at the 1924 Summer Olympics
People from Vyškov
Sportspeople from the South Moravian Region